Fauziya Kassindja (born 1977, Kpalimé, Togo), also known as Fauzia Kasinga, is the author of Do They Hear You When You Cry? an autobiographical story of her refusal to submit to kakia, the Togo ritual of female genital mutilation, and a forced marriage. She fled Togo  and traveled first to Germany, where she obtained a fake passport, and then to the United States where she immediately informed immigration officials that her documents were false and requested asylum.

She was detained by the U.S. Citizenship and Immigration Services and imprisoned. Fauziya's family hired a law student, Layli Miller Bashir, to advocate for her asylum, who in turn enlisted the help of Karen Musalo, an expert in refugee law and then acting director of the American University International Human Rights Clinic. Fauziya was granted asylum on 13 June 1996, in the landmark decision Matter of Kasinga.

In 2002, Kassindja contributed an essay called Remaining Whole While Behind Bars to the book That Takes Ovaries!: Bold Females and Their Brazen Acts (Three Rivers Press, 2002). She lives in Alexandria, Virginia.

References

Living people
1977 births
21st-century Togolese writers
21st-century Togolese women writers
Togolese non-fiction writers
21st-century non-fiction writers
People from Kpalimé
Togolese emigrants to the United States
Violence against women in Togo